Lynn Nightingale, later Connor (born August 5, 1956) is a Canadian former competitive figure skater. She won gold medals at the Skate Canada International, Prague Skate, Richmond Trophy and Prize of Moscow News, as well as four Canadian national titles (1974–77). She finished in the top ten at the 1976 Winter Olympics in Innsbruck, where she placed 9th, and at five World Championships.

Nightingale graduated from the University of Western Ontario in 1985.

Results

References

1956 births
Living people
Canadian female single skaters
Figure skaters at the 1976 Winter Olympics
Figure skaters from Edmonton
Olympic figure skaters of Canada
University of Western Ontario alumni
20th-century Canadian women
21st-century Canadian women